Don Short may refer to:

Don L. Short (1903–1982), American politician
Don Short (journalist)